Xanthorhoe pontiaria is a species of geometrid moth in the family Geometridae. It is found in North America.

The MONA or Hodges number for Xanthorhoe pontiaria is 7379.

References

Further reading

 
 

Xanthorhoe
Articles created by Qbugbot
Moths described in 1906